Belcourt is a surname. Notable people with the surname include:

Christi Belcourt (born 1966), Canadian artist
Émile Belcourt (1926–2017), Canadian operatic tenor
Georges-Antoine Belcourt (1803–1874), Canadian Jesuit missionary and priest
Gordon Belcourt (1945–2013), Native American leader
Michael Belcourt (born 1964), Canadian cyclist
Napoléon Belcourt (1860–1932), Canadian politician, lawyer and legal scholar
Shane Belcourt (born 1972), Canadian writer and film director
Tim Belcourt (born 1962), Canadian curler
Tony Belcourt (born 1943), Canadian politician and film director

Métis culture